Jefferson B. Fordham was the ninth Dean of the University of Pennsylvania Law School, and the tenth Dean of the Ohio State University Moritz College of Law.

Education

Fordham was a Phi Beta Kappa graduate of the University of North Carolina, where he also earned his master's degree. He received a law degree from the Yale Law School in 1930, where he was a member of the Order of the Coif.

Legal career

Fordham began his legal career working in Government service in Washington, DC and private practice in New York, New York in the 1930s.  He then served in the Pacific as a lieutenant commander in the Navy in World War II.  After returning from the war theater, Fordham entered academic working as a professor of law at the Louisiana State University Paul M. Hebert Law Center and Vanderbilt University Law School.  In 1947, Fordham became the tenth Dean of the Ohio State University Moritz College of Law.  He then served as ninth Dean of the University of Pennsylvania Law School from 1952 until he reached emeritus status in 1970. Roberts Hall, Pepper Hall and the law school dormitories were built during his tenure as Dean.  From 1972 to 1993, Fordham was a professor of law at the University of Utah S.J. Quinney College of Law.

In 1974, Martin Meyerson, president of the University and Bernard Wolfman, dean of the University of Pennsylvania Law School, announced that the Jefferson B. Fordham Professorship of Law had been created at the Law School in honor of Fordham.

Scholarly work

Fordham was an expert on constitutional and municipal law.

References

External links

The University of Utah, S.J. Quinney College of Law has created a digital collection devoted to Dean Fordham's life and career. It can be found at http://cdn.law.utah.edu/fordham/index.html

University of North Carolina alumni
Yale Law School alumni
Moritz College of Law faculty
Deans of University of Pennsylvania Law School
University of Pennsylvania Law School faculty
Deans of law schools in the United States
1906 births
1994 deaths
American legal scholars
20th-century American academics